The Nabisipi River is a salmon river in the Côte-Nord region of Quebec, Canada. It flows into the Gulf of Saint Lawrence

Location

The Nabisipi River rises in Lake Saumur.
It lies between the basins of the Pashashibou River to the west and the Aguanish River to the east.
It crosses the Canadian Shield, and has many rapids.
At first it flows through the unorganized territory of Lac-Jérôme.
The mouth of the river is in the municipality of Aguanish in the Minganie Regional County Municipality.
The name in the Innu language means "man's river".

Description

The Dictionnaire des rivières et lacs de la province de Québec (1914) says,

Fishing

The river has always been fished by the aboriginal people.
Huard (1897: 349) wrote of the Nabisipi River, "It was about 1855 that the Rochette families settled there, after the Hudson's Bay Company had abandoned the salmon fishing station it had on the little Nabisipi River ... in the latter years [before 1897] the whole of the Nabisippians embarked to seek fortune under a more favorable sky."
In the 1960s there was a research station on its banks.
There is an old fish ladder that the salmon still use.
The Nabisipi Outfitter, co-managed by the Innu, protects the resource, and encourages catch and release of all salmon.

Atlantic salmon typically do not return to the river until July.
The last  of the river has five pits that can be used for sport fishing by boat or wading.
The average catch weighs .
As of 2019 the Nabisipi UenapeuHipu outfitters, based at the mouth of the river, arranged for salmon fishing trips with guides and a cook.

In May 2015 the Ministry of Forests, Wildlife and Parks of Quebec announced a sport fishing catch-and-release program for large salmon on sixteen of Quebec's 118 salmon rivers.
These were the Mitis, Laval, Pigou, Bouleau, Aux Rochers, Jupitagon, Magpie, Saint-Jean, Corneille, Piashti, Watshishou, Little Watshishou, Nabisipi, Aguanish and Natashquan rivers.
The Quebec Atlantic Salmon Federation said that the measures did not go nearly far enough in protecting salmon for future generations.
In view of the rapidly declining Atlantic salmon population catch-and-release should have been implemented on all rivers apart from northern Quebec.

Notes

Sources

Rivers of Côte-Nord